The Festival do Rio is an international film festival in Rio de Janeiro. The festival was the result of a 1999 merger of two previous film festivals, the Rio Cine Festival and the Mostra Banco Nacional de Cinema. Founded in 1984 and 1988 respectively, the two festivals were held within a period of two months between each other. To avoid overloading the city with two film festivals within a short period of time, the two events were eventually merged.

References

External links

Film festivals in Brazil
Festivals in Rio de Janeiro
Film festivals established in 1999
1999 establishments in Brazil